Dov Charney (born January 31, 1969) is a Canadian entrepreneur and clothing manufacturer. He is the founder of American Apparel, which was one of the largest garment manufacturers in the United States until its bankruptcy in 2015. Charney subsequently founded Los Angeles Apparel.

Early life
Charney was born in Montreal, Quebec on January 31, 1969. His father is an architect, and his mother is an artist. Charney is a nephew of architect Moshe Safdie. 
Charney is dyslexic and was diagnosed with ADD in kindergarten.

He attended Choate Rosemary Hall, a private boarding school in Connecticut and St. George's School of Montreal. According to Charney, he was heavily influenced by both Montreal culture and his own Jewish heritage.

While attending high school in the United States, Charney began importing Hanes and Fruit of the Loom t-shirts from the U.S. to his friends in Canada. In an interview with Vice, he described smuggling the shirts on Amtrak trains from New York to Montreal.

American Apparel
Charney began selling t-shirts under the American Apparel name in 1989. In 1990, he dropped out of Tufts University, borrowed $10,000 from his parents and established American Apparel in South Carolina. Over the next several years, he spent time learning about manufacturing and wholesale before moving to Los Angeles in the mid-'90s. The company focused on crafting high-quality basics. By 1997, Charney had moved all manufacturing into a factory located in downtown Los Angeles.

American Apparel products were marketed towards "young metropolitan adults." The basic, logo-free branding appealed to younger consumers wary of corporate branding. Rather than compete with mass-market companies like Fruit of the Loom, American Apparel flourished in its "high-end niche by leveraging product quality, hip design, and the appeal of its anti-sweatshop politics."

The company had about $12 million in sales by 2001. In 2003, Charney opened the first store in L.A.'s Echo Park neighborhood, followed by one each in New York and Montreal. Within two years, the company had expanded to Europe and opened 65 new stores. By 2006, there were 140 total stores.

In 2009, it expanded to 281 total retail locations, making it "the fastest retail roll-out in American history." In 2014, the company reported record sales of $634 million dollars.

Ad campaigns 
American Apparel under Charney's leadership was known for its simple and provocative ads, which rarely used professional models and whom were often chosen personally by Charney from local hangouts and stores. He shot many of the advertisements himself and was criticized for featuring models in sexually provocative poses. However, the campaigns were also lauded for honesty and lack of airbrushing.

In 2012, the company made headlines when it debuted an ad campaign featuring mature model Jacky O'Shaughnessy. The photos generated considerable buzz and were generally well-received.

American Apparel again stirred controversy in 2014 when they displayed mannequins with pubic hair in the window of their Lower East Side store. Regarding the use of the mannequins, the company told Elle Magazine:

"American Apparel is a company that celebrates natural beauty, and the Lower East Side Valentine's Day window continues that celebration. We created it to invite passerbys to explore the idea of what is 'sexy' and consider their comfort with the natural female form. This is the same idea behind our advertisements, which avoid many of the photoshopped and airbrushed standards of the fashion industry. So far we have received positive feedback from those that have commented, and we're looking forward to hearing more points of view."

Activism
Under Charney's leadership, American Apparel took a leading role in the promotion of a number of prominent social causes.

Legalize LA 

Legalize LA was an immigration reform campaign conceived by Charney and promoted by American Apparel beginning in 2004. The campaign featured billboards and full-page ads in national publications as well as t-shirts sold in retail locations emblazoned with the words "Legalize LA." Proceeds from the sale of the shirts were donated to immigration reform advocacy groups. The campaign called for the overhaul of immigration laws so as to create a legal path for undocumented workers to gain citizenship in the United States.

Legalize Gay 
In November 2008, after the passing of Proposition 8, which banned same-sex marriages in California, Dov Charney and American Apparel created "Legalize Gay" T-shirts to hand out to protesters at rallies. The positive reaction led American Apparel to sell the same shirts in stores and online.

Factory conditions 
In an interview with Vice.tv, Charney spoke out against the poor treatment of fashion workers in developing countries and refers to the practices as "slave labor" and "death trap manufacturing." Charney proposed a "Global Garment Workers Minimum Wage" and discussed in detail many of the inner workings of the modern fast fashion industry practices that creates dangerous factory conditions and disasters like the 2013 Savar building collapse on May 13, which had the death toll of 1,127 and 2,500 injured people who were rescued from the building alive.

Dismissal 
American Apparel publicly suspended Charney on 18 June 2014, stating that they would terminate him for cause in 30 days. The termination letter given to Charney alleged that he had engaged in conduct that "repeatedly put himself in a position to be sued by numerous former employees for claims that include harassment, discrimination and assault."

Paula Schneider, who took over as company CEO, claimed Charney was fired "for violating our sexual harassment and our anti-discrimination policy" and "for misuse of corporate assets."

According to reports, Charney was blindsided by news of his termination, calling it a "coup." In court filings by his attorneys, it was alleged that the American Apparel CFO had sketched out a plan to oust Charney, and that he was persuaded to sign a disastrous settlement that left him with no job and no control of the company, despite being the largest shareholder. Charney also argued that the investigation was biased because it was conducted by people who wanted him out, and that he has never been charged with any crime or found guilty or liable for any of the accusations against him.

In December 2014, Charney was terminated as a Chief Executive Officer after months of suspension. In December 2014, Charney told Bloomberg Businessweek he was down to his last $100,000 and that he was sleeping on a friend's couch in Manhattan.  Following his suspension as CEO in the summer of 2014, Charney teamed up with the Standard General hedge fund to buy stocks of the company to attempt a takeover. In 2016, American Apparel board dismissed a $300 million offer from Hagan Group that pushed for Charney's comeback.

In the wake of his dismissal, reports of Charney's management style emerged. Business Inside stated that he wasn't "...able to install a mature operational infrastructure to keep the company running smoothly." also claiming that Charney wasn't able to build a "management bench strength" for American Apparel. Andrew Ross Sorkin, writing for the New York Times stated that Charney "should have been gone long ago, face of the brand or not."

Los Angeles Apparel
In 2016, Charney founded Los Angeles Apparel. He opened Los Angeles Apparel's first factory in South Central Los Angeles, with aims of replicating the successes he experienced in the 1990s with supplying wholesale clothing. The origins are similar to those he deployed while expanding American Apparel. When interviewed by Vice News regarding his new venture, Charney said,  "my previous company had an effect on the culture of young adults...I want to reconnect and do that again before I die".

The company grew to over 350 staff during the second year of operation. During an interview with Bloomberg, Charney drew comparisons to the growth he experienced with American Apparel calling it the equivalent of "year eight". Charney expected the fashion line to grow to $20 million in revenue by 2018.

Similar to American Apparel, the manufacturing of all Los Angeles Apparel garments are kept in the US to maintain low lead times and offer better completion times than overseas competitors. Los Angeles Apparel also provides livable wages to factory workers.

Following the outbreak of the COVID-19 pandemic in the United States, Charney repurposed his business operations to help increased demand for PPE. According to the Los Angeles Times, Charney spotted shortages as early as February and this is when his apparel company began to consider manufacturing face masks.

Charney was interviewed in March 2020 by a number of media outlets, speaking about his desire to turn Los Angeles Apparel into a medical equipment manufacturer during the pandemic. Los Angeles Apparel then began manufacturing face masks and medical gowns at the facility in South Central. Charney told The New York Times that he aimed to create 300,000 masks and 50,000 gowns each week. In an interview, Charney said he was "losing money on the venture," as he was giving many of them away. This included donating large numbers to key workers in healthcare and law enforcement in LA, Seattle, New York City and Las Vegas.

Controversy
Charney has been the subject of several sexual harassment lawsuits, at least five since the mid-2000s, all of which were settled, dismissed or remanded to private arbitration. Due to employees signing documents revoking legal claims against Charney or the company, many lawsuits were thrown out by the courts and had to go through internal arbitration at American Apparel. He has never been found to have committed sexual harassment. Charney's lawyer, Keith Fink, told Business Insider that, "In many instances, cases were defeated or dismissed. In other instances, cases were settled because the insurance company whose only goal is to save total dollars wanted to stop the legal bleeding on these cases." Charney maintained his innocence, telling CNBC that "allegations that I acted improperly at any time are completely a fiction." He accused lawyers in the lawsuits against American Apparel of extortion and of "shaking the company down."

In 2004, Claudine Ko of Jane magazine published an essay narrating that Charney began masturbating in front of her while she was interviewing him.  The article's publication brought extensive press to Charney, who later responded that he believed that the acts had been done consensually, in private and outside the article's bounds. In a follow-up to her first article, Ko wrote that her article had been misconstrued, stating that her encounter with Charney "was being used to feed a flawed cliche where men are evil and omnipotent while women are mute victims lacking free will." She further questioned the notion that she had been taken advantage of: "Who was really exploited? We both were—American Apparel got press, I got one hell of a story. And that's it."

Personal life 
Charney lives in Garbutt House, a historic mansion atop a hill in Silver Lake designed by Frank Garbutt, an early movie pioneer and industrialist. The house is made entirely out of concrete due to Garbutt's fear of fire. The house often functions as a dormitory for out-of-town workers doing business at company headquarters. During his time at American Apparel Charney was consumed with work, often sleeping in his office at the company's factory, leaving little separation between his personal and work life.

Awards 

 2005, "Marketing Excellence Award" at the LA Fashion Awards.
 2008, "Retailer of the Year" at the Michael Awards for the Fashion Industry.
 2009, Charney was a finalist for TIME Magazine's annual list of the '100 most influential people in the world.'

References

External links

Official American Apparel website 
Dov Charney website

Canadian fashion designers
Canadian retail chief executives
California people in fashion
Living people
Canadian expatriates in the United States
Businesspeople from Los Angeles
Businesspeople from Montreal
Canadian Jews
Canadian people of Lebanese-Jewish descent
Jewish fashion designers
Anglophone Quebec people
Choate Rosemary Hall alumni
Tufts University alumni
Canadian company founders
Canadian people of Israeli descent
21st-century Canadian businesspeople
1969 births
People with dyslexia